Llanidloes Without is a rural community in north Powys (Montgomeryshire), Wales. Settlements within the community include Van, Oakley Park and Glan-y-nant.

Geography

Llanidloes Without is a rural community with few settlements, located in Mid-Wales. It surrounds the town of Llanidloes on three sides, but does not include it. Its boundaries include Llyn Clywedog Lake in the north and the River Severn to the south.  It is bordered by the Powys communities of Trefeglwys to the north, Llangurig to the south, Llandinam to the east and shares a small border with the Ceredigion community of Blaenrheidol to the west.

The community had a population of 661 according to the 2011 UK Census, of which 370 were born in Wales.

Governance
Llanidloes Without has its own community council, comprising seven community councillors and a clerk, who oversee planning applications and other issues of local interest.

The community is part of the Blaen Hafren electoral ward (with the neighbouring Llangurig and Trefeglwys communities) which sends a county councillor to sit on Powys County Council.

References

Communities in Powys